Ceridia is a genus of moths in the family Sphingidae. The genus was erected by Walter Rothschild and Karl Jordan in 1903.

Species
Ceridia heuglini (R. Felder 1874)
Ceridia mira Rothschild & Jordan 1903
Ceridia nigricans Griveaud 1959

References

Smerinthini
Moth genera
Taxa named by Walter Rothschild
Taxa named by Karl Jordan